Lydia Tamasin Day-Lewis (born 17 September 1953) is an English television chef and food critic, who has also published a dozen books about food, restaurants, recipes and places. She writes regularly for The Daily Telegraph, Vanity Fair, and Vogue.

Biography
Day-Lewis was born in Hammersmith, London. Day-Lewis is the daughter of Anglo-Irish poet Cecil Day-Lewis, who served as Poet Laureate of the United Kingdom in his last years, and his second wife, British actress Jill Balcon. She is Jewish on her mother's side, a descendant of 19th-century immigrants from Poland and Lithuanian Jews from what is now Latvia. Her brothers are actor Sir Daniel, Nicholas and Sean Day-Lewis (who wrote a biography of their father). After attending Bedales School, she read English at King's College, Cambridge from 1973 until 1976.

She writes for The Daily Telegraph, Vanity Fair, Vogue and Food Illustrated.

She is currently on the Board of Governors at the Bristol Old Vic Theatre School.

In October 2012, Day-Lewis and her brother Daniel donated papers belonging to their father to Oxford University, including early drafts of his work and letters from figures such as actor John Gielgud and poets W. H. Auden, Robert Graves and Philip Larkin.

In 2011 she collaborated with Hemmerle and created the book Delicious Jewels published by Prestel.

Bibliography
 The Englishwoman's Kitchen (Ed.) (1983) 
 Last Letters Home (1995) 
 West of Ireland Summers: A Cookbook (1997) 
 The Art of the Tart (2000) 
 Simply the Best: The Art of Seasonal Cooking (2001) 
 Good Tempered Food: Recipes to Love, Leave and Linger Over (2002) 
 Tarts with Tops on: Or How to Make the Perfect Pie (2004) 
 Tamasin's Weekend Food: Cooking to Come Home to (2004) 
 Tamasin's Kitchen Bible (2005) 
 Tamasin's Kitchen Classics (2006) 
 Where Shall We Go For Dinner?: A Food Romance (2007) 
 Supper for a Song (2009)  Book Review
 All You Can Eat (2007)

References

External links

UKTV Profile – Tamasin Day-Lewis 

1953 births
Living people
English chefs
English television chefs
English food writers
People from Greenwich
People educated at Bedales School
Alumni of King's College, Cambridge
English Jews
English people of Irish descent
English people of Latvian-Jewish descent
English people of Polish-Jewish descent
Day-Lewis family